Timo Nagy (born 20 April 1983) is a German football midfielder.

References

External links

1983 births
Living people
German footballers
SV Wacker Burghausen players
Association football defenders
SpVgg Unterhaching players
Hannover 96 II players
Hannover 96 players
German people of Hungarian descent
FC Carl Zeiss Jena players
SV Wehen Wiesbaden players
2. Bundesliga players
3. Liga players
Association football midfielders
People from Altötting
Sportspeople from Upper Bavaria
Footballers from Bavaria